"Soldier" is the first of two episodes of The Outer Limits television series written by Harlan Ellison and is loosely adapted from his 1957 short story "Soldier from Tomorrow." Ellison later brought suit against the producers and distributor of The Terminator (1984) for plagiarism of this episode.

Plot
Eighteen hundred years in the future, two infantrymen clash on a battlefield.  A random energy weapon strikes both and they are hurled into a time vortex. While one soldier is temporarily trapped in the time limbo, the other, Qarlo Clobregnny, materializes in an alley off a city street in the United States in the year 1964.

The feral Qarlo is soon captured and later interrogated by Tom Kagan, a philologist. Qarlo's origin is eventually discovered after Kagan translates his seemingly unintelligible language – "Nims qarlo clobregnny prite arem aean teaan deao" – into colloquial English..."(My) name is Qarlo Clobregnny, private, RM EN TN DO"; his name, rank and serial letters, which is what any soldier would reveal if captured by the enemy. Qarlo has been bred and trained for one purpose – to kill the enemy. Progress is made in "taming" him, however, and despite the reservations of Kagan's government associates, Kagan takes Qarlo to his home and family. Although he seemingly begins to trust Kagan, Qarlo breaks into a gun shop and brings home a rifle. 

Meanwhile, the time eddy holding the enemy soldier eventually weakens and he materializes in 1964 and tracks Qarlo to Kagan's home. In a final hand-to-hand battle, the soldiers kill each other, but the question is posed whether Qarlo sacrificed his life because he was trained to kill, or because he wanted to save the Kagan family.

Production
Interiors were shot at Paramount Studios. Qarlo's "War Zone" was shot on the Paramount Sunset stage, a gigantic stage the size of three stages put together. A sky cyclorama ran all the way round it and a horizon line of mountains was placed in front of that in diminished perspective. A fog machine provided the landscape with a smokey haziness.  The gun shop scene was filmed on the Paramount Backlot, on New York Street.

The Terminator
Ellison brought suit against The Terminator production company Hemdale and distributor Orion Pictures for plagiarism of this episode, since both works involve a soldier from the future who goes back in time and saves the life of a present-day woman from an enemy soldier from the future. According to the Los Angeles Times, the parties settled the lawsuit for an undisclosed amount, and an acknowledgement of Ellison's works in the credits of Terminator. The credits were added only to the home video releases of Terminator and read simply, "Acknowledgment to the Works of Harlan Ellison".

James Cameron emphatically denied Ellison's allegations and was opposed to the settlement, stating "For legal reasons I'm not suppose [sic] to comment on that (the addition of acknowledgement credits) but it was a real bum deal, I had nothing to do with it and I disagree with it."

Cast

Sequel
Author Kevin J. Anderson later wrote a prose sequel for the episode entitled Prisoner of War which was published in the anthology The Outer Limits: Armageddon Dreams.

Notes

External links
 

The Outer Limits (1963 TV series season 2) episodes
1964 American television episodes
Television episodes written by Harlan Ellison
Television episodes about time travel
Fiction set in 1964
Fiction set in the 4th millennium
Adaptations of works by Harlan Ellison
Television episodes directed by Gerd Oswald